Littau railway station is a railway station in the locality of Littau, within the municipality of Lucerne, in the Swiss canton of Lucerne. It is an intermediate stop on the standard gauge Bern–Lucerne line of Swiss Federal Railways.

Services 
The following services stop at Littau:

 Lucerne S-Bahn:

References

External links 
 
 

Railway stations in the canton of Lucerne
Swiss Federal Railways stations
Buildings and structures in Lucerne
Transport in Lucerne